In geometry, a hendecagon (also undecagon or endecagon) or 11-gon is an eleven-sided polygon. (The name hendecagon, from Greek hendeka "eleven" and –gon "corner", is often preferred to the hybrid undecagon, whose first part is formed from Latin undecim "eleven".)

Regular hendecagon

A regular hendecagon is represented by Schläfli symbol {11}.

A regular hendecagon has internal angles of 147.27 degrees (=147  degrees). The area of a regular hendecagon with side length a is given by

As 11 is not a Fermat prime, the regular hendecagon is not constructible with compass and straightedge. Because 11 is not a Pierpont prime, construction of a regular hendecagon is still impossible even with the usage of an angle trisector. 

Close approximations to the regular hendecagon can be constructed. For instance, the ancient Greek mathematicians approximated the side length of a hendecagon inscribed in a unit circle as being 14/25 units long.

The hendecagon can be constructed exactly via neusis construction and also via two-fold origami.

Approximate construction

The following construction description is given by T. Drummond from 1800:
"Draw the radius A B, bisect it in C—with an opening of the compasses equal to half the radius, upon A and C as centres describe the arcs C D I and A D—with the distance I D upon I describe the arc D O and draw the line C O, which will be the extent of one side of a hendecagon sufficiently exact for practice." 
On a unit circle:
 Constructed hendecagon side length 
 Theoretical hendecagon side length 
 Absolute error  – if  is 10 m then this error is approximately 2.3 mm.

Symmetry

The regular hendecagon has Dih11 symmetry, order 22. Since 11 is a prime number there is one subgroup with dihedral symmetry: Dih1, and 2 cyclic group symmetries: Z11, and Z1.

These 4 symmetries can be seen in 4 distinct symmetries on the hendecagon. John Conway labels these by a letter and group order. Full symmetry of the regular form is r22 and no symmetry is labeled a1. The dihedral symmetries are divided depending on whether they pass through vertices (d for diagonal) or edges (p for perpendiculars), and i when reflection lines path through both edges and vertices. Cyclic symmetries in the middle column are labeled as g for their central gyration orders.

Each subgroup symmetry allows one or more degrees of freedom for irregular forms. Only the g11 subgroup has no degrees of freedom but can seen as directed edges.

Use in coinage
The Canadian dollar coin, the loonie, is similar to, but not exactly, a regular hendecagonal prism, as are the Indian 2-rupee coin and several other lesser-used coins of other nations. The cross-section of a loonie is actually a Reuleaux hendecagon. The United States Susan B. Anthony dollar has a hendecagonal outline along the inside of its edges.

Related figures
The hendecagon shares the same set of 11 vertices with four regular hendecagrams:

See also
10-simplex - can be seen as a complete graph in a regular hendecagonal orthogonal projection

References

External links
Properties of an Undecagon (hendecagon) With interactive animation

Regular hendecagons
Regular hendecagon, an approximate construction 

Polygons by the number of sides
11 (number)
Elementary shapes